The Ellmauer Halt (2,344 m) is the highest peak in the mountain massif of the Wilder Kaiser in the Kaiser range (Northern Limestone Alps) in the Austrian state of Tyrol. To the east is the summit of the Kapuzenturm, a striking and isolated rock pinnacle. In 1883 the first summit cross was erected on the mountain top.

The base camp for climbing tours on this mountain is the Grutten Hut mountain hut on its southern flank, at a height of 1,620 m. There is also the unoccupied, tiny Babenstuber Hut, immediately below the summit. This shelter and emergency refuge has stood on the Ellmauer Halt since 1891, but is not weatherproof. In any case the peak should only be climbed in good weather with dry conditions by experienced climbers with secure footwear, no fear of heights and climbing agility. Due to the popularity of the Ellmauer Halt there is a high risk of falling rocks, especially on the normal path, the Gamsängersteig. A helmet and even a Klettersteig set are therefore recommended.

Routes 
Two well-known Klettersteigs (climbing paths) lead to the summit:

 The Gamsängersteig from the Grutten Hut is the normal route and is of medium difficulty. It is generally well secured, but is used on good summer's days by countless climbers, so there is a high risk of falling rocks. It takes 2.5 hours to climb.
 The Kaiserschützensteig is a demanding alternative to the normal route. It is much longer, harder and technically more difficult than the Gamsängersteig. In addition, in starting from the Kaisertal,  a substantial approach march and greater height difference have to be overcome. The starting points are the Anton Karg Haus or Hans Berger Haus. The Kaiserschützensteig is very scenic and crosses all three summits of the massif: the Kleine Halt, the Gamshalt and the Ellmauer Halt and offers some impressive views. Climbing time: 4 hours.

Also:

 Rote-Rinn-Scharte (Rote Rinn wind gap) which is the marked climb running from the Hans-Berger-Haus via the Scharlinger Boden up to the Rote-Rinn-Scharte. This saddle is also used by the Gamsängersteig, enabling the Grutten Hut to be reached. This route acts as a link between the Kaisertal in the north and the Grutten Hut in the south.
 The so-called Kopftörlgrat is the eastern arête of the Ellmauer Halt over which a very popular climbing route runs (UIAA grade III-IV).

See also 
List of Alpine peaks by prominence

References

External links 

 Description of the Gamsängersteig and Kaiserschützensteig 
 Gamsänger Klettersteig, Ellmauer Halt 
 Climbing routes on the Ellmauer Halt 
 "Wilder Kaiser, Austria" on Peakbagger

Mountains of the Alps
Mountains of Tyrol (state)
Kufstein
Kaiser Mountains